The Women's Scratch was one of the 6 women's events at the 2002 UCI Track Cycling World Championships, held in Copenhagen, Denmark.

19 Cyclists from 19 countries participated in the race. Because of the number of entries, there were no qualification rounds for this discipline. Consequently, the event was run direct to the final.

Final
The Final and only race was run at 15:40 on September 29. The competition consisted on 40 laps, making a total of 10 km.

References

Women's scratch
UCI Track Cycling World Championships – Women's scratch
UCI